The Miss Tierra República Dominicana 2008 pageant was held on June 17, 2008. This year 40 candidates competed for the national crown. The winner represented the Dominican Republic at the Miss Earth 2008 beauty pageant, which was held in Manila. In this pageant the provinces are represented with the name of the provincial capital or city in the Province. The Miss República Dominicana Ecoturismo will enter Miss Eco-Turismo 2008.

Results

Special awards
 Miss Photogenic (voted by press reporters) - Evelin Periel (San Cristóbal)
 Miss Congeniality (voted by Miss Dominican Republic Universe contestants) - Fatima Reyes (Hermanas Mirabal)
 Miss Internet - Annè de la Cruz (Jarabacoa)
 Best Face - Diana Flores (San Francisco de Macorís)
 Best Provincial Costume - Ana Vinicio (Neiba)
 Miss Cultura - Marieli Sánchez (Dajabón)
 Miss Elegancia - Yatnna Alvares (Espaillat)
 Best Talent - Waleska de la Cruz (Santo Domingo Este)
 Best Representation of their Province or Municipality - Alfonsina González (Puerto Plata)

Delegates

Trivia
Miss Com. Dom. Puerto Rico entered in Miss DR 05.
Miss Barahona would enter Miss Turismo Dominicana 2008

External links
 http://www.misstierrard.com/
 http://www.diarioadiario.com/?module=displaystory&story_id=14262&edition_id=31&format=html
 https://web.archive.org/web/20080811125719/http://www.diariodigital.com.do/articulo,30385,html
 http://cronicadigital.com.do/modabelleza/eligen-miss-republica-dominicana-tierra-2008/26,153,2168,html

Miss Dominican Republic
2008 beauty pageants
2008 in the Dominican Republic